Ruggero Borghi (born 13 June 1970 in Cantù) is a former Italian professional road bicycle racer who rode for UCI ProTeam Domina Vacanze in 2005.

Palmares 

1994
2nd Overall Giro Ciclistico d'Italia
1998
8th Trofeo Matteotti
2000
1st Overall Trofeo dello Scalatore
3rd Parts 1 & 2
3rd Wartenberg Rundfahrt
2001
1st Trofeo dello Scalatore
3rd Giro di Romagna
5th GP Industria & Commercio di Prato
2002
5th Gran Premio di Lugano
5th GP Industria Artigianato e Commercio Carnaghese
10th Giro di Toscana
2003
7th Giro del Lazio
7th GP Industria & Commercio di Prato
8th Coppa Sabatini
9th Overall Ster Elektrotoer
2004
3rd GP Industria & Artigianato Larciano
5th GP Nobili Rubinetterie
6th Giro di Toscana
7th Trofeo Melinda
9th Coppa Sabatini
10th Giro del Friuli

External links 

 12 Speed by Ruggero Borghi

1970 births
Living people
Italian male cyclists
Cyclists from the Province of Como
People from Cantù